The 2014 Fiji National Football League was the 38th season of the Fiji Premier League administered by the Fiji Football Association (FFA) since its establishment in 1977. The home and away season began on 18 January 2013 and the final was on 17 May 2014. Ba FC and Nadi FC represented the Fiji National Football League in the 2013–14 OFC Champions League after finishing as Champions and Runners-up respectively in the 2013 Fiji National Football League competition.

Clubs

Standings

2014 Pillay’s Garments Champion vs Champion

Details

Regular season

Round 1

Round 2

Round 3

Round 4

Round 5

Round 6

Round 7

Round 8

Round 9

Round 10

Top scorers

Positions by round

References

Fiji Premier League seasons
Fiji
National Football League